The 2004 Centrix Financial Grand Prix of Denver was the ninth round of the 2004 Bridgestone Presents the Champ Car World Series Powered by Ford season, held on August 15, 2004 on the streets of Denver, Colorado near the Pepsi Center.  Sébastien Bourdais swept the pole and the race win.

Qualifying results

Race

Caution flags

Notes

 New Track Record Sébastien Bourdais 59.942 (Qualification Session #2)
 New Race Lap Record Sébastien Bourdais 1:01.256
 New Race Record Sébastien Bourdais 1:40:25.232
 Average Speed 89.103 mph

Championship standings after the race

Drivers' Championship standings

 Note: Only the top five positions are included.

References

External links
 Full Weekend Times & Results
 Friday Qualifying Results
 Saturday Qualifying Results
 Race Box Score

Denver
Centrix Financial Grand Prix
Centrix Financial Grand Prix of Denver